Jennifer A. Johnson Jordan (born June 8, 1973) is an American female beach volleyball player. She won the silver medal at the 1999 Beach Volleyball World Championships in Marseille, alongside Annett Davis.

She attended the University of California, Los Angeles (UCLA), and was a member of their Bruins volleyball team. She competed in the 2000 Summer Olympics with Davis, finishing in fifth place.

Personal
Johnson Jordan currently resides in Tarzana, California, with husband Kevin Jordan, a former UCLA wide receiver, and their two children, Jaylen (born 2001) and Kory (born 2005).

She is the daughter of the Olympic decathlon champion Rafer Johnson and the niece of Pro Football Hall of Fame player Jimmy Johnson.

Johnson Jordan was currently a girls' varsity volleyball assistant coach at the Windward School in Los Angeles, California. She is now the 	Associate Head Coach for beach volleyball at UCLA, where the team has won the 2018 and 2019 national championships.

References

 

1973 births
Living people
American women's beach volleyball players
Beach volleyball players at the 2000 Summer Olympics
Place of birth missing (living people)
Olympic beach volleyball players of the United States
UCLA Bruins women's volleyball players
Rafer Johnson family
20th-century American women